Erwin Argenis Moreira Alcivar (born June 15, 1987) is an Ecuadorian football defender who plays for Colón F.C. in the Ecuadorian Serie B.

Club career
At LDU Quito, he spent the first couple of matches in 2011 as an alternate. He gained his first cap with the team starting against Manta FC on February 20, 2011. In the same match, he scored his first goal for the team and opened up the scoreboard in a 5–0 rout.

In January 2020, Moreira joined Ecuadorian Serie B club Manta FC.

References

External links
Moreira's FEF player card

1987 births
Living people
People from Manta, Ecuador
Association football defenders
Ecuadorian footballers
Delfín S.C. footballers
C.D. Técnico Universitario footballers
C.S.D. Macará footballers
L.D.U. Quito footballers
C.D. Cuenca footballers
Mushuc Runa S.C. footballers
L.D.U. Portoviejo footballers
Manta F.C. footballers